Liu Quan may refer to:

Liu Quan (prince) (劉全; died 79), Eastern Han Dynasty prince, son of Emperor Zhang of Han
 (劉全; died 1799), housekeeper of corrupt official Heshen